Iuliu Farkaș (8 September 1923 – 9 May 1984) was a Romanian footballer who played as a forward.

International career
Iuliu Farkaș played 9 matches and scored 6 goals for Romania, making his debut on 30 September 1945 when coach Coloman Braun-Bogdan sent him on the field at half-time to replace Francisc Spielmann in a friendly which ended with a 7–2 loss against Hungary. He played four games at the 1947 Balkan Cup, scoring a hat-trick in a 4–0 away victory against Albania and one goal in a 3–1 home loss against Yugoslavia. He played two games at the 1948 Balkan Cup scoring two goals in a 3–2 victory against Bulgaria. Farkaș's last game for the national team was a friendly which ended 1–1 against Albania.

Honours
Ferencvárosi
Magyar Kupa: 1941–42, 1942–43

References

External links

Magyarfutball profile

Romanian footballers
Romania international footballers
Association football forwards
1923 births
1984 deaths
Liga I players
Liga II players
Nemzeti Bajnokság I players
CSM Jiul Petroșani players
FC Dinamo București players
FC Rapid București players
Ferencvárosi TC footballers
FC Carmen București players
People from Petroșani